Joanna Bessey (born 1976) is an actress and director from Malaysia. She is best known for her role as Marie Tan in the situation comedy Kopitiam which ran for 7 seasons.

Early life
Bessey was born in West Sussex to a British father and Malaysian  mother of Malay descent with Minangkabau lineage.

Career
Bessey has appeared in over 200 episodes of television, 6 TV movies, 5 feature films, commercials with 2 major celebrity endorsements, voice-over work for commercials and animated series and numerous theatre productions, over the last 10 years. Other TV credits include La Dolce Amira, Bilik 13, All Mixed Up and Island FM. She has been in feature films such as Lips to Lips, Buli, 1957- Hati Malaya and Waris Jari Hantu.

Bessey appeared on BBC World News hosting the
travel documentary "Exploring Malaysia". She is also an environmentalist.

In 2020, Bessey made her videogame debut by voice acting as Eve in No Straight Roads

Personal life
She is married to German husband Aurel Wunderer. They have a son born in 2011.

Accolades
She has had the following nomations: 'Best Actor in a Supporting Role' at the 'Boh' Cameronian Arts Awards 2007, "Best Director" for her directorial debut of Ibsen's 'An Enemy of the People", 'Best Actress in a Comedy Role' for the award-winning sitcom, "Kopitiam" at the Asian Television Awards (Singapore) and was highly commended. She was voted Best Female Artist in 2000 by a public online poll.

References

External links
 
 JoannaBessey.com

1976 births
Living people
People from West Sussex
Malaysian people of Malay descent
Malaysian people of Minangkabau descent
Malaysian people of British descent
Malaysian people of English descent
Malaysian film actresses
Malaysian television actresses
Malaysian television personalities